De Queen is a city and the county seat of Sevier County, Arkansas, United States. The population was 6,629 at the 2010 census.
The placename is the anglicization of the family name of the Dutch merchant and railway financier, Jan de Goeijen (1861–1944).  
De Goeijen was reportedly rather unhappy with the deformation of his name.

Geography
De Queen is located at  (34.039994, −94.341964).

Demographics

2020 census

As of the 2020 United States census, there were 6,105 people, 1,865 households, and 1,380 families residing in the city.

2010 census
As of the census of 2010, there were 6,629 people in De Queen.  The median age was 29.  The ethnic and racial composition of the population was 36.7% non-Hispanic white, 5.6% non-Hispanic black, 2.3% Native American, 0.7% Asian, 35.1% reporting some other race and 4.2% reporting two or more races.  53.5% of the population was Hispanic or Latino of any race.

2000 census
As of the census of 2000, there were 5,765 people, 1,913 households, and 1,377 families residing in the city. The racial makeup of the city was 66.40% White, 6.07% Black or African American, 2.38% Native American, 0.21% Asian, 0.10% Pacific Islander, 23.07% from other races, and 1.77% from two or more races.  38.59% of the population were Hispanic or Latino of any race.

There were 1,913 households, out of which 39.0% had children under the age of 18 living with them, 52.7% were married couples living together, 13.2% had a female householder with no husband present, and 28.0% were non-families. 24.0% of all households were made up of individuals, and 11.8% had someone living alone who was 65 years of age or older.  The average household size was 2.93 and the average family size was 3.44.

In the city, the population was spread out, with 30.3% under the age of 18, 11.7% from 18 to 24, 28.3% from 25 to 44, 16.8% from 45 to 64, and 12.9% who were 65 years of age or older.  The median age was 30 years. For every 100 females, there were 96.9 males.  For every 100 females age 18 and over, there were 93.2 males. 

The median income for a household in the city was $25,707, and the median income for a family was $31,582. Males had a median income of $21,542 versus $17,367 for females. The per capita income for the city was $12,968.  About 21.3% of families and 26.9% of the population were below the poverty line, including 36.7% of those under age 18 and 18.5% of those age 65 or over.

Climate
The climate in this area is characterized by hot, humid summers and generally mild to cool winters.  According to the Köppen Climate Classification system, De Queen has a humid subtropical climate, abbreviated "Cfa" on climate maps.

Transportation
De Queen is served by US Route 70, US Route 71, and Arkansas State Highway 41.

Intercity bus service is available from Jefferson Lines.

De Queen has freight rail service through the De Queen and Eastern Railroad.

The J Lynn Helms Sevier County Airport (FAA ID: KDEQ), three miles west of town, has a 5001’ x 75’ paved runway.

Education

De Queen hosts a campus of the Cossatot Community College of the University of Arkansas.
The college also provides non-credit coursework in adult education: GED classes, ESL training, test preparation, and computer literacy.

The DeQueen School District operates area public schools.

Historic places

De Queen has multiple locations on the National Register, including:
Bishop Brookes House
DeQueen & Eastern Railroad Machine Shop
DeQueen Commercial Historic District
First Presbyterian Church
Hayes Hardware Store
Otis Theodore and Effiegene Locke Wingo House
Tres Agaves

Notable people
J. Oscar Humphrey, Arkansas State Auditor from 1929 to 1935 and 1937 to 1956
Collin Raye, country music singer.
Wes Watkins, Oklahoma politician lived for a time in De Queen as a child.
Otis Wingo, member of the United States House of Representatives from Arkansas's 4th congressional district, practiced law in De Queen before his congressional career.

See also 
Other US places related to De Goeijen ("De Queen"):
 Zwolle, Louisiana (named after his hometown)
 Amsterdam, Missouri (named after his firm's location)
 Vandervoort, Arkansas (mother)
 Mena, Arkansas (wife)
 DeRidder, Louisiana (sister-in-law)

References

External links

Cities in Sevier County, Arkansas
Cities in Arkansas
County seats in Arkansas